Whitewall tires or white sidewall (WSW) tires are tires having a stripe or entire sidewall of white rubber. These tires were most commonly used from the early 1900s to around the mid 1980s.

Background
The use of whitewall rubber for tire has been traced to a small tire company in Chicago called  Vogue Tyre and Rubber Co that made them for their horse and chauffeur drawn carriages in 1914.

Early automobile tires were made of pure natural rubber with various chemicals mixed into the tread compounds to make them wear better. The best of these was zinc oxide, a pure white substance that increased traction and also made the entire tire white. However, the white rubber did not offer sufficient endurance, so carbon black was added to the rubber to greatly increase tread life. Using carbon black only in the tread produced tires with inner and outer sidewalls of white rubber. Later, entirely black tires became available, the still extant white sidewalls being covered with a somewhat thin, black colored layer of rubber. Should a black sidewall tire have been severely scuffed against a curb, the underlying white rubber would be revealed; it is in a similar manner that raised white letter (RWL) tires are made.

Overview
The status of whitewall tires versus blackwall tires was originally the reverse of what it later became, with fully black tires requiring a greater amount of carbon black and less effort to maintain a clean appearance these were considered the premium tire; since the black tires first became available they were commonly fitted to many luxury cars through the 1930s. During the late-1920s gleaming whitewalls contrasted against darker surroundings were considered a stylish, but high-maintenance feature. The popularity of whitewalls as an option increased during the 1930s. On April 6, 1934, Ford introduced whitewall tires as an $11.25 option on all its new cars. But automobile designs incorporating streamlining directed visual interest away from tire walls.

The availability of whitewall tires was limited in the U.S. during the supply shortages of raw materials during World War II and the Korean War.

Wide whitewall tires reached their height in popularity by the early-1950s. The 1957 production version of the Cadillac Eldorado Brougham was fitted with whitewalls that were reduced to a 1" wide stripe floating on the tire sidewall with a black area between this stripe and the wheel rim. The whitewall stripe width began to diminish as an attempt to reduce the perceived height of the wheel/tire. During the decade, increasingly lower vehicle heights were in vogue. During the 1950s, Fender skirts also covered up white wall tires.

Wide whitewalls generally fell out of favor in the U.S. by the 1962 model year. They continued as an option on the Lincoln Continental for some time thereafter but most common were narrower  stripe whitewalls. During the mid-1960s variations on the striped whitewall began to appear; a red/white stripe combination was offered on Thunderbirds and other high-end Fords, and triple white stripe variations were offered on Cadillacs, Lincolns, and Imperials. Whitewall tires were a popular option on new cars during the 1950s and 1960s, as well as in the replacement market. In some cases, having whitewall tires were a "must have" to get the right look on a car; and for those who could not afford the real deal, add-ons could be installed over the rim of the wheel that could leak if the pressure was too high.

New tires were wrapped in paper for shipping, to keep the white stripe clean, and for preventing the black of other tires from rubbing on the whitewall side. Maintaining a clean sidewall was an issue. Some motorists added aftermarket "curb feelers" that were attached at the bottom of the wheel opening lip to help reduce scraping the whitewall tire against curbs.

By 1968, wide whitewall tires were no longer available on the Chevrolet Corvette; replaced by F70x15 bias-ply nylon cord tires with thin stripes, either a narrow white or narrow red stripe.

The single-sided whitewall remained a desirable option through the 1970s, becoming a hallmark of "traditional luxury". Radial tires made by Vogue Tyre  featured a narrow whitewall with a thin gold stripe line toward the edge of the tire. They were most often fitted to luxury cars.

Modern
Full-fledged wide whitewalls have made a return within modified car culture. The resurgence of traditional hot rods, customs, retro, lowriders and resto-cal cars have also contributed to the resurgence in whitewall tires.

Although wide whitewalls are virtually nonexistent as a factory option on modern automobiles, they are still manufactured in original bias-ply or radial form by specialty outlets such as Coker Tire and Vogue Tyre. The last car available in the United Kingdom with whitewall tires was the Kia Pride. Some companies manufacture wide whitewall inserts - the so-called "Portawall" inserts are usually sold through Volkswagen Beetle restoration companies. Another modern incarnation has been tire decals, which can be applied to a normal tire to give the whitewall look.

Modern trends toward more minimal styling, and large wheels favoring very low-profile tires leave little room for a whitewall. The Lincoln Town Car continued to be offered with a factory whitewall option—a narrow white stripe—until its discontinuation in 2010. It is not currently offered as a factory option by any car manufacturer, but it is possible to order whitewalls for motorcycles (for example, the 2014–present Indian Chief).

Gallery

References 

Tires
Automotive styling features